Dolinka is a village and municipality in the Veľký Krtíš District of the Banská Bystrica Region of southern Slovakia.

History
In historical records, the village was first mentioned in 1258 (Inam). In 1506 it belonged to Verbőczy family, and after to ecclesiastical Esztergom’s Capitol. From 1939 to 1944 it belonged to Hungary.

Genealogical resources

The records for genealogical research are available at the state archive "Statny Archiv in Banska Bystrica, Nitra, Slovakia"

 Roman Catholic church records (births/marriages/deaths): 1771-1895 (parish B)

See also
 List of municipalities and towns in Slovakia

External links
http://www.dolinka.org/
https://web.archive.org/web/20080111223415/http://www.statistics.sk/mosmis/eng/run.html
http://www.e-obce.sk/obec/dolinka/dolinka.html
Surnames of living people in Dolinka

Villages and municipalities in Veľký Krtíš District